Shi Xiufeng (born September 16, 1987) is a Chinese basketball player for Beijing Great Wall and the Chinese national team.

She participated at the 2017 FIBA Women's Asia Cup.

References

1987 births
Living people
Chinese women's basketball players
Basketball players from Liaoning
Small forwards
Asian Games silver medalists for China
Asian Games medalists in basketball
People from Tieling
Beijing Great Wall players
Shanghai Swordfish players
Medalists at the 2014 Asian Games
Basketball players at the 2014 Asian Games